The extensor retinaculum (dorsal carpal ligament, or posterior annular ligament) is an anatomical term for the thickened part of the antebrachial fascia that holds the tendons of the extensor muscles in place. It is located on the back of the forearm, just proximal to the hand. It is continuous with the palmar carpal ligament, which is located on the anterior side of the forearm.

Structure 
The extensor retinaculum is a strong, fibrous band, extending obliquely downward and medialward across the back of the wrist. It consists of part of the deep fascia of the back of the forearm, strengthened by the addition of some transverse fibers.

The extensor retinaculum is attached laterally to the lateral margin of the radius. However, it is not attached to the ulna, as the distance between these two bones varies with supination and pronation of the forearm. Instead the medial attachment is to the pisiform bone and triquetral bone. Other authors may state the medial attachment of extensor retinaculum with the fifth metacarpal bone and the pisometacarpal ligament. The retinaculum is also attached in its passage across the wrist, to the ridges on the dorsal surface of the radius.

There are six separate synovial sheaths run beneath the extensor retinaculum: (1st) abductor pollicis longus and extensor pollicis brevis tendons, (2nd) extensor carpi radialis lungus and brevis tendons, (3rd) extensor pollicis longus tendon, (4th) extensor digitorium communis and extensor indicis proprius tendons, (5th) extensor digiti minimi tendon and (6th) extensor carpi ulnaris tendon.

Histology 
Structurally, the retinaculum consists of three layers. The deepest layer, the gliding layer, consists of hyaluronic acid-secreting cells. The thick middle layer consists of  interspersed elastin fibers, collagen bundles, and fibroblasts. The most superficial layer is made up of loose connective tissue which contains vascular channels. Combined these three layers create a smooth gliding surface as well as mechanically strong tissue which prevents tendon bowstringing. The extensor retinaculum of the foot has similar structure.

Clinical significance 
Studies conducted on the retinaculum have exhibited it to have several possible surgical treatments uses. A graft of the extensor retinaculum was shown to be useful in treating boxer's knuckle when direct repair of the damaged capsule is not possible. Because of their similarities in histological structure, studies also show the extensor retinaculum to be a reasonable biological replacement for reconstruction of a deficient annular pulley.

Additional images

References

External links
 

Human anatomy